Get Rich Quick Porky is a 1937 Warner Bros. Looney Tunes cartoon directed by Bob Clampett. The short was released on August 28, 1937, and stars Porky Pig.

Chuck Jones, later to be famed as a director, is credited as animator on the short. This cartoon marks the final appearance of Gabby Goat until New Looney Tunes. The short's working title was The Oily Bird gets Porky.

Summary
The title screen changes seamlessly into a sign reading: "Get Rich Quick", followed by "For Sale/This lovely lot containing lots and lots/Oh!--Just oodles of OIL!" An oil tanker pulls into the lot, and the lot's owner, dogface con artist John Gusher, hooks the tanker to a sprinkler system to make it appear as if the land is saturated with natural crude oil, in hopes of luring some suckers to buy the otherwise worthless land. Out of the corner of his eye, he spies Porky Pig and Gabby Goat ascending the steps of the First National Bank, where Porky means to deposit the money contained in a sack that he is holding; Gabby eagerly tries to convince Porky not to deposit his money (this in a time when bank failures were still fresh in recent memory) and spend his savings on pleasure, like a yacht "or a chocolate soda or something;" Porky insists on getting his 2% interest. Mr. Gusher jumps in front of the two, barely introduces himself by way of a hastily drawn and withdrawn business card, and points out the plot just across the street. With Gabby egging him on, Porky signs the wayward oilman's deed and turns over his sack in exchange for the field.

The two friends, having gathered some tools in the meanwhile, begin their excavation. Gabby, by means of a pickaxe, unearths a can of oil. A dog wanders onto the property and attempts to bury a bone, only to have it spat back at him by a small gusher; the dog has some further difficulties restraining the spouts of crude. Gabby rides a jackhammer as "The Merry-Go-Round Broke Down" plays, and, as he can not control the device, drills into the earth and out again, and in again, not to be seen again for several moments. We return to the dog, who is confronted by a gopher, who performs a magic trick: he flattens the soup bone with his hands, then causes it to appear out of the dog's left ear, to the canine's delight. The gopher then buries the bone for the dog to personally exhume: but the dog only gets a face full of oil, while the gopher magically removes the bone from his "volunteer"'s mouth and absconds with it to his subterranean lair, leaving the poor dog to howl in frustration!

Returning to Porky, he hits a small squirt of oil that disappears quickly; when he hits the same spot again with his pickaxe, he discovers a piece of the sprinkler system and realizes he's been conned. An angry Porky confronts Gusher and demands his money back, but Gusher (feigning sincerity) offers only one dollar in return for the deed. Porky, reluctantly, begins to hand over the deed. By this point Gabby, still astride his jackhammer, is far beneath the earth. Just as Porky is about to accept Mr. Gusher's offer, Gabby hits a large vein of natural crude oil, which then bursts through the surface and carries all of the major characters high into the air just before Gusher can get his hands on the deed. Porky realizes his new wealth and latches onto the deed, with Gusher also getting his hands on it and causing a tug of war battle. Gabby unintentionally strikes Gusher with the jackhammer, leading the crook to shout in pain and let go of the deed. Gabby and Porky fall to the ground, with Porky proudly holding the deed in his hand—only to find that instead, he has the dog's bone. A despondent Porky turns away, but his sulking is interrupted by the gopher; silently requesting the useless bone, the cheerful gopher transmutes the bone back into the deed, but only offers to return it if Gabby and Porky give the gopher a 50% share of the deed as "partners."

Home media
Get Rich Quick Porky lapsed into the public domain in 1966. It has been widely distributed on discount media since then, usually in the form of poor-quality colorized prints.

References

External links
 Get Rich Quick Porky (Colorized) on the Internet Archive

Looney Tunes shorts
Warner Bros. Cartoons animated short films
1937 films
Films directed by Bob Clampett
1930s American animated films
Porky Pig films
Films about hoaxes
American black-and-white films
Films scored by Carl Stalling
Films about gophers
Films about con artists